is a Japanese manga series written and illustrated by Keiko Ishihara. It began serialization in Hakusensha's LaLa DX magazine in August 2017. As of August 2022, nine volumes have been released.

Publication
Written and illustrated by Keiko Ishihara, the series began serialization in Hakusensha's LaLa DX magazine on August 10, 2017. As of August 2022, the series' individual chapters have been collected into nine tankōbon volumes.

At Anime Expo 2019, Viz Media announced that they licensed the series for English publication.

Volume list

Reception
Ian Wolf of Anime UK News praised the artwork and action in the story. He also favorably compared the story to Yona of the Dawn. Morgana Santilli of Comics Beat also praised the use of violence and action in the story. Additionally, Santilli favorably compared the protagonist Freya to Sailor Moon and felt the artwork was similar to shōjo manga from the 1990s and 2000s. Hannah Collins of Comic Book Resources felt the plot was typical of shōjo manga, she felt it still had a "satisfying effect".

The series was nominated for the Next Manga Award in 2020.

References

External links
 

Action anime and manga
Fantasy anime and manga
Hakusensha manga
Male harem anime and manga
Shōjo manga
Viz Media manga